Provincial elections were held in the Pakistani province of Punjab on to elect the members of the 17th Provincial Assembly of the Punjab on 25 July 2018, alongside nationwide general elections and three other provincial elections in Sindh, Balochistan and Khyber Pakhtunkhwa. The remaining two territories of Pakistan, AJK and Gilgit-Baltistan, were ineligible to vote due to their disputed status.

After the elections, Pakistan Tehreek-e-Insaf was able to form the government in Punjab, with Sardar Usman Buzdar as the Chief Minister of Punjab.

Background
In the 2013 elections, the Pakistan Muslim League (N) came out with well above a supermajority in the assembly with a landslide haul of 313 seats, and were comfortably able to form a government. They were followed by the Pakistan Tehreek-e-Insaf, which held only 30 seats.

The election was notable for the downfall of the Pakistan Peoples Party and the Pakistan Muslim League (Q), which, before the elections, held 106 and 79 seats respectively but were reduced to merely 8 seats each, due to the rise of PTI and PML (N), although the sheer numbers that the PML (N) held in the assembly shocked many analysts.

Shehbaz Sharif, brother of PML (N) chairman and two-time Prime Minister, Nawaz Sharif, became Chief Minister for the third time in his life, securing over 300 votes in the assembly.

Janoobi Punjab Sooba Mahaz
On April 10, 2018, 10 of the ruling PML-N's prominent elected candidates from South Punjab, parted ways from the party and announced a movement for the creation of South Punjab province. The movement was titled Janoobi Punjab Sooba Mahaz (lit. Front for South Punjab Province). In the coming weeks, the movement garnered widespread support and dissident MPs from the ruling coalition, as well as independents, started joining it. At its peak, the movement had the backing of 42 MPs. On May 8, 2018, the movement announced its merger with Pakistan Tehreek-e-Insaf, the opposition party in the province, after PTI assured JPSM's leaders that creating the South Punjab province is a priority item in their manifesto for the 2018 elections.

Results

The results showed a virtual tie between the Pakistan Tehreek-e-insaf and the Pakistan Muslim league (N). With Independents joining the party, Pakistan Tehreek-e-insaf came up just short of an absolute majority. Pakistan Tehreek-e-insaf and Pakistan Muslim league (Q) formed a coalition government in Punjab assembly.

Division-wise results

District-wise results

See also
2022 Punjab provincial by-election

References

2018 elections in Pakistan
2018